Upokongaro or Ūpokongaro is a settlement  upriver from Whanganui, New Zealand, in the Makirikiri Valley. Settled by Europeans in the 1860s, it was an important ferry crossing and riverboat stop. A spectacular discovery of moa bones was made in the area in the 1930s.

Māori history 
The village's name in Māori, ūpoko (head) ngaro (hidden), refers to a story of how chief's daughter Ira-nga-rangi arranged to have her head removed upon her death and hidden by relatives, who feared it might be desecrated by enemies. Supposedly the preserved head was hidden in a  cave on the banks of the Ūpokongaro Stream north of the settlement, from which the village takes its name.

At the time of European contact, both Ūpokongaro and adjacent settlements Waipakura and Kukuta were home to the Ngāti Patutokotoko hapū of the iwi Te Āti Haunui-a-Pāpārangi. Ngāti Iringirangi and Nga Paerangi are also noted as being present. The fortified hilltop pā at Ūpokongaro was called Opiu; during the tense times of the 1840s, Opiu was pulled down and abandoned.

Waipakura, south of Ūpokongaro, was one of a number of native reserves set aside in the 1848 Deed of Sale; some of it was leased to settlers in the 1860s. Ūpokongaro was described as a "small pā" in 1865, and Māori settlement persisted until at least the 1880s. The pā site at Opiu was used as a refuge for settlers' wives and children in 1862, when there were fears of Hau Hau war parties, and was later turned into a redoubt.

European settlement 
In 1866, settler John Kennedy built a hotel and a store (later the post office); during the 1870s and '80s, the local name for Ūpokongaro was "Kennedy's". A school was built in 1870, known from 1873–1879 as the North Makirikiri or "River Bank" school.

The schoolroom functioned for Anglican services in the mid 1870s, but in 1877 St Mary's Anglican Church was built. Designed by local architect Edward Morgan and built by John Randal, St Mary's is distinctive in having a spire with a triangular cross-section, on a four-sided steeple. Its stained glass window was installed in 1879, in memory of Archibald Montgomery, a young Upokongaro man lost in the sinking of the clipper Avalanche in the English Channel just before the church was completed. St Mary's is the oldest church in the Whanganui District on its original site.

Moa discovery 
In the 1930s, thousands of moa bones were recovered from mud springs in the Upokongaro Valley at Makirikiri by a Wanganui Museum expedition. Life-sized concrete moa sculptures commemorating this can be seen on the main road outside the Upokongaro Cafe.

Education

Cycle trail 
Ūpokongaro is on the Mountains to Sea cycle trail (Ngā Ara Tūhono), at the junction of the  Whanganui River Road and  Ūpokongaro to the Tasman Sea sections. The sections are linked by Ūpokongaro Cycle Bridge, which opened on 2 December 2020.

References

 

Whanganui River
Populated places in Manawatū-Whanganui
Settlements on the Whanganui River
Whanganui District